Charlotte Avery is a British actress. She has a son with Australian actor Craig McLachlan, and two other children. She played Tina Stewart in EastEnders in 2005, and also played a minor character in 1996.

Avery appeared in a National Theatre 80th birthday tribute to Lord Olivier, Happy Birthday, Sir Larry on 31 May 1987, in the presence of Olivier.

Filmography 

 EastEnders – Marie (1996), Tina Stewart (2005)
 Waking the Dead – Christine Murphy (2004)
 Doctors – Bridget Walsh (2004)
 Murder in Mind – Nadine Hadley (2003)
 Warrior Angels – Eve (2002)
 Dark Blue Perfume – Young Katherine (1997)
 The New Adventures of Robin Hood – Gwynedd (1997)
 The Bill – Helen Sims (1997)
 Thin Ice – Natalie (1995)
 Lady Chatterley – Julia Hammond (1993)
 Rides – Sacha (1992)
 Jeeves and Wooster – Mabel (1991)
 The Famous Five – Marybelle Lenoir (1978)

Theatre
Mom in Starlight Express (Voice over).
Buffy the Buffet Car in Starlight Express.

References

External links 
 
 

Living people
English soap opera actresses
English voice actresses
Year of birth missing (living people)